Portuguese Americans, also known as Luso-Americans (luso-americanos), are citizens and residents of the United States who are connected to the country of Portugal by birth, ancestry, or citizenship.

Americans and others who are not native Europeans from Portugal but originate from countries that were former colonies of Portugal do not necessarily self-identify as "Portuguese American", but rather as their post-colonial nationalities, although many refugees (referred to as retornados) from former Portuguese colonies, as well as many white Brazilians, are ethnically or ancestrally Portuguese. In 2017, an estimated 48,158 Portuguese nationals were living in the United States.

Some Melungeon communities in rural Appalachia have historically self-identified as Portuguese. Given their complex ancestry, individual Melungeons may descend from Portuguese people, but not all do.

History
 

Bilateral ties date from the earliest years of the United States. Following the American Revolutionary War, Portugal was the first neutral country to recognize the United States.

Portuguese people have had a very long history in the United States, since 1634. The first documented Portuguese to live in colonial America was Mathias de Sousa, a Sephardic Jew. The oldest synagogue in the country, the Touro Synagogue, is named after one of these early Portuguese Jews, Isaac Touro.

Some of the earliest European explorers to reach continental North America in the Age of Discovery were Portuguese explorers, such as João Fernandes Lavrador. Navigators, like the Miguel Corte-Real family, may have visited the North American shores at the beginning of the 16th century.

There is a historic landmark, the Dighton Rock, in Southeastern Massachusetts, that a small minority of scholars believe testifies their presence in the area. Portuguese explorer João Rodrigues Cabrilho explored the California coast for the first time.

During the Colonial period, there was a small Portuguese immigration to the present-day U.S., especially to the islands of Martha's Vineyard and Nantucket.

Peter Francisco, the giant soldier in the Continental Army, is generally thought to have been born Portuguese, from the Azores.

In the late 19th century, many Portuguese, mainly Azoreans and Madeirans, emigrated to the eastern U.S., establishing communities in New England coastal cities, primarily but not limited to Providence, Bristol, Warwick, and Pawtucket in Rhode Island, and Taunton, Brockton, Fall River, and New Bedford in Southeastern Massachusetts.

Another part of Massachusetts that attracted many Portuguese immigrants was Northern Massachusetts, most notably Lowell and Lawrence. In addition, Many Portuguese immigrants also went to nearby Southern New Hampshire. Massachusetts was a key location for Portuguese immigrants due to the availability of low skill jobs. Many migrants came to the United States with little knowledge of the English Language, and textile jobs were frequently available in these areas. Portuguese migrants had to seek out low skill jobs because of education in Portugal and the lack of job availability in the nineteenth century.

A small number of Portuguese immigrants settled in the city of Boston. These Portuguese immigrants mainly settled in East Boston and North End. In addition, Many Portuguese immigrants also went to Cambridge and Somerville.

A Portuguese community existed in the vicinity of the Carpenter Street Underpass in Springfield, Illinois, one of the earliest and largest Portuguese settlements in the Midwestern United States. By the early twentieth century, the project area represented the western extension of a neighborhood known as the "Badlands." The Badlands was included in the widespread destruction and violence of the Springfield Race Riot in August 1908, an event that led to the formation of the National Association for the Advancement of Colored People (NAACP). The Carpenter Street archaeological site possesses local and national significance for its potential to contribute to an understanding of the lifestyles of multiple ethnic/racial groups in Springfield during the nineteenth and early twentieth centuries.
 
On the West Coast in California there are Portuguese communities in San Francisco, Oakland, San Jose, Santa Cruz, as well as in dairy farming areas in the Central Valley, the Los Angeles Basin, and San Diego, in connection to Portuguese fishermen and settlers emigrating to California from the Azores. There are also connections with Portuguese communities in the Pacific Northwest in Astoria, Oregon, and Seattle, Washington, and British Columbia, Canada as well. Many of the Portuguese communities on the west coast were farming towns. Portuguese who moved to California often saved money to buy land to start farming. Portuguese farmers in California and along the west coast of the United States often hired other Portuguese migrants as farm hands. Aside from farming Portuguese migrants also were able to secure jobs as fishermen in port cities.

Portuguese migration to Hawaii occurred often in the late nineteenth century due to the availability of labor contracts on the islands. Labor contracts paid for the migration of entire families. This was enticing for families looking to migrate without the means or the desire to migrate in stages. This led to families having to work off debt before they could move off of the island. Often times Portuguese migrants decided just to remain in Hawaii despite there being little opportunity for improving their lives.

Whaling 
In the 1840s, whaling ships were the way to get to America, after a slow voyage of two to three years. In the early 1700s, Massachusetts dominated the whaling industry with Nantucket, Cape Cod and New Bedford. By the early 19th century, New Bedford had become the center of whaling in America. When whalers were out at sea, they would frequently stop in the Azores to recruit crew members for help. At the end of their voyage, they docked in New England, where crew members often settled as immigrants. Today, one can visit the Whaling Museum in New Bedford, Massachusetts and encounter authentic Portuguese whaling history.

20th century 
After World War II, there was another wave of Portuguese immigration to the country, mainly in the northeastern United States (New Jersey, New York, Connecticut, Rhode Island, Massachusetts and Maryland), and also in California. Many were fleeing the right-wing dictatorship of Antonio Salazar. There are Portuguese clubs, principally in the larger cities of these states, which operate with the intention of promoting sociocultural preservation as venues for community events, athletics, etc. 

Many Portuguese Americans may include descendants of Portuguese settlers born in Africa (like Angola, Cape Verde, and Mozambique) and Asia (mostly Macanese people), as well Oceania (Timor-Leste). There were around 1 million Portuguese Americans in the United States by 2000.

As with other immigrants that arrived in America, several Portuguese surnames have been changed to align with more American sounding names, for example Rodrigues to Rogers, Oliveira to Oliver, Martins to Martin, Pereira to Perry, Moraes or Morais to Morris, Magalhães to McLean, Souto to Sutton, Moura to Moore, Serrão to Serran, Silva to Silver or Sylvia, Rocha to Rock (or Stone), Madeira or Madeiros to Wood, Pontes to Bridges, Fernandes to Frederick, Costa to Charlie, Emo or Emos to Emma and Santos to Stan.

A general contribution the Portuguese people have made to American music is the ukulele, which originated in Madeira and was initially popularized in the Kingdom of Hawaii. John Philip Sousa was a famous Portuguese American composer most known for his patriotic compositions.

A large amount of mingling took place between Chinese and Portuguese in Hawaii. There were very few marriages between European and Chinese people with the majority being between Portuguese and Chinese people. These unions between Chinese men and Portuguese women resulted in children of mixed parentage, called Chinese-Portuguese. For two years to June 30, 1933, 38 of these children were born; they were classified as pure Chinese because their fathers were Chinese. Curiously, these marriages are in marked contrast to the situation in Macau, where very few Han Chinese married Portuguese settlers; instead, the Portuguese mixed with indigenous Tanka people, leading to the Macanese people.

Capelinhos Volcanic Eruption and the Azorean Refugee Act of 1958
In 1957–58, the Capelinhos volcano erupted on the Azorean island of Faial, causing massive destruction from lava and smoke. In response, then Senators John F. Kennedy and John Pastore co-sponsored an Azorean Refugee Act. President Dwight Eisenhower signed the legislation in 1958, making 1,500 visas available to the victims of the eruption. An extension was enabled in 1962, providing opportunities for even more immigrants. According to the United States Census from 2000, there were 1,176,615 Portuguese-Americans, the majority being of Azorean descent.

This led to the passing of the 1965 Immigration Act, which stated if someone has legal or American relatives in the United States, they could serve as a sponsor and, therefore could be a legal alien. This act dramatically increased Portuguese immigration into the 1970s and 1980s.

Portuguese-American literature 
There are four anthologies of Portuguese-American literature: Luso-American Literature: Writings by Portuguese-Speaking Authors in North America edited by Robert Henry Moser and António Luciano de Andrade Tosta and published in 2011, The Gávea-Brown Book of Portuguese-American Poetry edited by Alice R. Clemente and George Monteiro, published in 2013, Writers of the Portuguese Diaspora in the United States and Canada: An Anthology edited by Luís Gonçalves and Carlo Matos, published in 2015, and Behind the Stars, More Stars: The Tagus/Disquiet Collection of New Luso-American Writing edited by Christopher Larkosh and Oona Patrick, published in 2019 by Tagus Press. The list of accomplished writers is considerable: Katherine Vaz, Frank X. Gaspar, Millicent Borges Accardi, Sam Pereira, Nancy Vieira Couto, Alfred Lewis, Charles Reis Felix, Michael Garcia Spring and John dos Passos. In recent years, the Portuguese in the Americas Series at Tagus Press at UMass Dartmouth has been particularly active in publishing works by Portuguese-American authors, the most recent of these being The Poems of Renata Ferreira, by Frank X. Gaspar, published in 2020.

Demography

Portuguese-Americans are the fourth largest ethnic group in the state of Hawaii, fifth largest group in Rhode Island and the eighth largest group in Massachusetts.

Biggest communities
Portuguese-American communities in the U.S. according to the 5 Year Estimates of the (2016 American Community Survey):

U.S. by Ancestry: 1,367,476
U.S. by Country of Birth: 176,286

Top CSAs by Ancestry:

 Boston-Worcester-Manchester, MA-RI-NH CSA: 393,457
 New York-Newark-Bridgeport, NY-NJ-CT-PA CSA: 141,522
 San Jose-San Francisco-Oakland, CA CSA: 124,652
 Los Angeles-Long Beach-Riverside, CA CSA: 49,465
 Sacramento-Arden-Arcade-Yuba City, CA-NV CSA: 40,972
 Modesto-Merced, CA CSA: 38,031
 Miami-Fort Lauderdale-Port St. Lucie, FL CSA: 21,842
 Hartford-East Hartford, CT CSA: 21,599
 Philadelphia-Reading-Camden, PA-NJ-DE-MD CSA: 14,245

Top CSAs by Country of Birth:
 Boston-Worcester-Manchester, MA-RI-NH CSA: 68,875
 New York-Newark-Bridgeport, NY-NJ-CT-PA CSA: 47,964
 San Jose-San Francisco-Oakland, CA CSA: 10,570
 Modesto-Merced, CA CSA: 5,841
 Hartford-East Hartford, CT CSA: 3,873
 Miami-Fort Lauderdale-Port St. Lucie, FL CSA: 3,493
 Los Angeles-Long Beach, CA CSA: 3,153
 Springfield-Greenfield Town, MA CSA: 3,105
 Philadelphia-Reading-Camden, PA-NJ-DE-MD CSA: 2,610

Top States by Country of Ancestry:
 California: 346,172
 Massachusetts: 296,449
 Rhode Island: 96,433
 New Jersey: 76,952
 Florida: 69,147
 New York: 50,657
 Connecticut: 49,167
 Hawaii: 48,634
 Pennsylvania: 19,241
 New Hampshire: 18,170

Top States by Country of Birth:
 Massachusetts: 54,869
 New Jersey: 31,493
 California: 26,107
 Rhode Island: 16,384
 New York: 10,858
 Connecticut: 10,282
 Florida: 9,124
 Pennsylvania: 2,557
 Virginia: 1,751
 New Hampshire: 1,207

Top Cities by Country of Ancestry:
 Fall River, MA: 37,350
 New Bedford, MA: 30,390
 New York, NY: 13,837
 Taunton, MA: 13,825
 East Providence, RI: 13,295
 Dartmouth, MA: 12,907
 San Jose, CA: 11,712
 Newark, NJ: 9,764
 San Diego, CA: 9,307
 Pawtucket, RI: 7,077
 Honolulu, HI: 6,328
 Sacramento, CA: 6,007
 Boston, MA: 5,948
 Turlock, CA: 5,007
 Tiverton, RI: 4,838
 Elizabeth, NJ: 4,558
 San Francisco, CA: 4,518
 Providence, RI: 4,486
 Tulare, CA: 4,046
 Somerville, MA: 3,435
 Kearny, NJ: 3,958
 Philadelphia, PA: 3,366
 Las Vegas, NV: 3,233
 Hanford, CA: 3,071

U.S. states with largest Portuguese populations

Notable people

See also
Portugal–United States relations
Portuguese Australians
Portuguese Canadians
Portuguese Brazilians
Portuguese in the United Kingdom
Portuguese New Zealanders
Portuguese Argentine

References

Further reading
 Barrow, Clyde W. (2002). Portuguese-Americans and Contemporary Civic Culture in Massachusetts.
 Cardozo, Manoel da Silviera Soares (1976). The Portuguese in America, 590 B.C.–1974: A Chronology & Fact Book
 Leal, João, and Wendy Graça (2011). Azorean Identity in Brazil and the United States: Arguments about History, Culture, and Transnational Connections. Dartmouth, Massachusetts, Tagus Press.
 Norden, Ernest E. "Portuguese Americans." in Gale Encyclopedia of Multicultural America, edited by Thomas Riggs, (3rd ed., vol. 3, Gale, 2014), pp. 493–508. online
 Pap, Leo. The Portuguese-Americans (Twayne Publishers, 1981).
 Warrin, Donald, and Geoffrey L. Gomes (2013). Land, as Far as the Eye Can See: Portuguese in the Old West. Dartmouth, Massachusetts: Tagus Press. 376 pages. Traces the experiences of Portuguese immigrants as frontier settlers.
 Williams, Jerry R. (2007). In Pursuit of Their Dreams: A History of Azorean Immigration to the United States (2nd ed.). North Dartmouth, Massachusetts: University of Massachusetts Dartmouth.
 Wolforth, Sandra (1978). The Portuguese in America.
  - Compiled by Robert L. "Bob" Santos - HTML version
  - Compiled by Robert L. "Bob" Santos - HTML version

External links
Portuguese-American Historical & Research Foundation
Portuguese Americans. – Culture, History & People
UMass-Dartmouth Ferreira-Mendes Portuguese-American Archives
Portuguese-American Federation
Portuguese American Journal Portuguese American Journal

American people of Portuguese descent
European-American society
Portuguese American
American
Portuguese neighborhoods in the United States